A crab canon (also known by the Latin form of the name, canon cancrizans; as well as retrograde canon, canon per recte et retro or canon per rectus et inversus) is an arrangement of two musical lines that are complementary and backward. If the two lines were placed next to each other (as opposed to stacked), the lines would form something conceptually similar to a palindrome. The name 'crab' refers to the fact that crabs are known to walk backward (although they can also walk forward and sideways). It originally referred to a kind of canon in which one line is played backward (e.g. FABACEAE played simultaneously with EAECABAF). An example is found in J. S. Bach's The Musical Offering, which also contains a table canon ("Quaerendo invenietis"), which combines retrogression with inversion by having one player turn the music upside down.

See also
 Gödel, Escher, Bach by Douglas Hofstadter
 Mirror canon
 The Musical Offering

Sources

External links
 MIDI files of "A Musical Offering"

Polyphonic form